Gallaher may refer to:

Gallaher (surname)
Gallaher Group, a British-based multinational tobacco company

See also
Dave Gallaher Trophy
Gallacher
Gallager (disambiguation)
Gallagher (disambiguation)